Oberding is a municipality in the district of Erding in Upper Bavaria in Germany, and member of the same administrative community. Almost half of the area of Munich Airport, including both terminals, falls within the municipal bounds.

Geography 
Oberding is located in the Munich area in the middle of Erdinger Moos between the rivers Sempt and village. The village is located about 6 km north-west of the county Erding, 17 km south of Freising and 36 km from the state capital Munich in the immediate vicinity of the Munich Airport.

Community structure

Districts 
 Notzing
 Oberding

Other parts of municipalities 
 Aufkirchen
 Niederding
 Notzingermoos
 Oberdingermoos
 Schwaig
 Schwaigermoos

For the construction of the Munich Airport landing paths of in 1992, the residents of Franz home were partially displaced by Schwaiger Moos. Much of the current airport site, including the terminals is located in the municipality. For the planned construction of the third take-off and landing strip another partial removal of moss Schwaiger is necessary.

Waters 
The Middle-Isar-channel and the river village, both flow in roughly a north-south direction.

History 
The region was part of the Electorate Bavaria, forming a closed Hofmark of cathedrals of Bishopric of Freising, with the Bishopric in 1803 deleted. In the course of administrative reform, the Bavaria was given the Community Edict of 1818 by the church.

Population Development 
The region population in 1970 was 3,111, in 1987 3,229 and in 2000 4,692.

Policy 
The Mayor of Oberding is Bernhard Mücke, in office since 2014 and re-elected in 2020.
 
The municipal tax revenue in 1999 amounted to the equivalent of €6166 € T, which amounted to the business tax receipts (net) 3458 T converted.

Coat of arms and flag 
The coat of arms established on 25 May 1950 is "in blue at an angle on the left posed silver scythe." Besides the coat of arms, the town flag are the colors blue, white and blue.

Economy and Infrastructure

Economy, agriculture and forestry 
The largest contribution to the municipality is the Munich Airport Franz Josef Strauss, which opened in 1992, it is the most important economic factor; also in the district is the power station Santa Maria on the Middle-Isar-channel.

The official 1998 statistics:
 agriculture and forestry 22
 manufacturing 441
 trade and transport 436
 supported by social insurance 467

Also, in 1999 there were 121 agricultural holdings with a utilized agricultural area of 3,619 ha, of which 3,033 ha is arable land.

Education 
In 1999, there were the following facilities:
 Kindergarten: few kindergartens with 177 children
 Elementary Schools: 2 with 27 teachers and 451 students

Attractions 
 Catholic parish church of St. John the Baptist in Aufkirchen, 1725–30
 Catholic parish church of St. Martin in Niederding, 1757–60
 Catholic Church in St. Korbinian Schwaig, 1903–05
 Catholic Church in St. Nikolaus in Notzing
 Catholic Church of St. George branch in Upper thing, 1701/03, tower from the 14th century
 Kath Daughter church of St. Nicholas in Notzing, 2nd half of the 15th century, saddleback tower of the 13th or 14th century
 Castle Notzing, former water castle, 14th century

External links
 www.oberding.de Official website of the municipality Oberding
 www.notzing.de 
 St. John the Baptist in Santa Maria accessed on 23 November 2008

References

Erding (district)